Darband is a village in Gifan Rural District, Garmkhan District, Bojnord County, North Khorasan Province, Iran. At the 2006 census, its population was 360, in 96 families.

References 

Populated places in Bojnord County